Khabarovsk United Air Group Flight 3949 was a Russian domestic passenger flight from Yuzhno-Sakhalinsk to Khabarovsk, that crashed on 7 December 1995 local time (6 December UTC), killing all ninety-eight people aboard (including six children).

The aircraft operator, Khabarovsk United Air Group, was later rebranded to Dalavia and became defunct in 2008.

Background
The aircraft Tupolev Tu-154B-1, involved in the accident, was manufactured on 30 July 1976 under a serial number 76А164. Prior to the accident it accumulated 30,001 flight hours and underwent four repairs, the last one on 23 September 1991. Like other former Soviet aircraft, its registration letters in the Soviet period were SSSR (СССР); later the letters were changed to RA (РА).

At the time of the accident, the crew consisted of captain Viktor Sumarokov, first officer Stanislav Revidovich, navigating officer Alexander Martynov, flight engineer Grigory Moroz and four flight attendants.

Crash
The last contact with ATC was made on 03:00 a.m. local time (17:00 UTC). Eight minutes later the aircraft crashed into Bo-Dzhausa Mountain with a vertical speed of about 300 m/s and a pitch angle of about 70 degrees. The aircraft disintegrated into numerous fragments.

The investigation listed five possible causes, whose combination might have led to the crash. It is believed that in order to counteract the left-wing low flying tendency fuel-feed was selected from left wing fuel tanks only. The fuel imbalance likely caused the aircraft to bank to the right and the autopilot was able to counteract it for 35 minutes after take-off.

The crash site was found on 18 December 1995 by the crew of a Mil Mi-8 helicopter.

References

Aviation accidents and incidents in 1995
Aviation accidents and incidents in Russia
Accidents and incidents involving the Tupolev Tu-154
Transport in Primorsky Krai
1995 disasters in Russia
December 1995 events in Asia
History of Primorsky Krai